Myristica extensa is a species of plant in the family Myristicaceae. It is a tree endemic to Borneo.

References

extensa
Endemic flora of Borneo
Trees of Borneo
Vulnerable plants
Taxonomy articles created by Polbot